Peter Andreas Grünberg (18 May 1939 – 7 April 2018) was a German physicist, and Nobel Prize in Physics laureate for his discovery with Albert Fert of giant magnetoresistance which brought about a breakthrough in gigabyte hard disk drives.

Life and career
Grünberg was born in Pilsen, Bohemia—which at the time was in the German-occupied Protectorate of Bohemia and Moravia (now the Czech Republic)—to the Sudeten German family of Anna and Feodor A. Grünberg which first lived in Dysina (Dýšina) to the east of Pilsen. Grünberg was a Catholic.

After the war, the family was interned; the parents were brought to a camp. His father, a Russia-born engineer who since 1928 had worked for Škoda, died on 27 November 1945 in Czech imprisonment and is buried in a mass grave in Pilsen which is also inscribed with Grünberg Theodor † 27. November 1945. His mother Anna (who died in 2002 aged 100) had to work in agriculture and stayed with her parents in the Petermann house in Untersekerschan (Dolní Sekyřany), where her children (Peter's sister was born in 1937) were brought later. The remaining Grünberg family, like almost all Germans, was expelled from Czechoslovakia in 1946. Seven-year-old Peter came to Lauterbach, Hesse where he attended gymnasium.

Grünberg received his intermediate diploma in 1962 from the Johann Wolfgang Goethe University in Frankfurt. He then attended the Technische Universität Darmstadt, where he received his BSc diploma in physics in 1966 and his Ph.D. in 1969. While there, he met and married his wife, Helma Prauser, who became a schoolteacher. From 1969 to 1972, he did postdoctoral work at Carleton University in Ottawa, Canada. He later joined the Institute for Solid State Physics at Forschungszentrum Jülich, Jülich, Germany, where he became a leading researcher in the field of thin film and multilayer magnetism until his retirement in 2004.

In 1984–1985 he served as visiting scientist at Argonne National Laboratories, Lemont, Illinois, USA. From 1984 to 1992 he had Habilitation process and was a lecturer (Junior Professor), and since 1992 till 2004 a Tenured Professor (ausserplanmässiger Professor) at the University of Cologne, Germany. He was also a visiting professor at the Tohoku University at Sendai-shi, Miyagi-ken, Japan from 1998 till 2004.

In 2007, Grünberg was awarded Honorary Doctorate from the RWTH Aachen University, Aachen, Germany, in 2008 Honorary Doctorate from the Saarland University, and from Gebze Institute of Technology, and in 2009 from the University of Athens.

Important work
In 1986 he discovered the antiparallel exchange coupling between ferromagnetic layers separated by a thin non-ferromagnetic layer, and in 1988 he discovered the giant magnetoresistive effect (GMR). GMR was simultaneously and independently discovered by Albert Fert from the Université de Paris Sud. It has been used extensively in read heads of modern hard drives. Another application of the GMR effect is non-volatile, magnetic random access memory.

Apart from the Nobel Prize,  work also has been rewarded with shared prizes in the APS International Prize for New Materials, the International Union of Pure and Applied Physics Magnetism Award, the Hewlett-Packard Europhysics Prize, the Wolf Prize in Physics and the 2007 Japan Prize. He won the German Future Prize for Technology and Innovation in 1998 and was named European Inventor of the Year in the category "Universities and research institutions" by the European Patent Office and European Commission in 2006.

Honors and awards 

 American Physical Society's International Prize for New Materials (1994)
 International Union of Pure and Applied Physics (IUPAP) Magnetism Award (1994)
 Hewlett-Packard Europhysics Prize (1997) with Albert Fert and Stuart Parkin
 German Future Prize for Technology and Innovation (1998)
 Max Planck Society Member (2003).
 Germany Physical Society's Stern-Gerlach Medal (2006)
 European Inventor of the Year (2006)
 Wolf Prize in Physics (2006)
 Japan Prize (2007)
 Nobel Prize in Physics (2007)
 Friendship Award (China) (2016)

Selected publications

 
 
 
 
 M. Schäfer, Q. Leng, R. Schreiber, K. Takanashi, P. Grünberg, W. Zinn. 1995. "Experiments on Interlayer Exchange Coupling" (invited at 5th NEC Symp., Karuizawa, Japan). J. of Mat. Sci. and Eng. . B31, 17.

References

External links 

 Peter Grünberg webpage at Forschungszentrum Jülich
 List of selected papers
 

1939 births
2018 deaths
Scientists from Plzeň
German Roman Catholics
Sudeten German people
20th-century German physicists
German Nobel laureates
Nobel laureates in Physics
Wolf Prize in Physics laureates
Knights Commander of the Order of Merit of the Federal Republic of Germany
Members of the Order of Merit of North Rhine-Westphalia
People from Jülich
German people of German Bohemian descent
European Inventor Award winners
Technische Universität Darmstadt alumni
Academic staff of Technische Universität Darmstadt
21st-century German physicists